The list of shipwrecks in 2010 includes ships sunk, foundered, grounded, or otherwise lost during 2010.

January

5 January

16 January

25 January

30 January

February

17 February

19 February

21 February

Unknown date

March

10 March

11 March

26 March

31 March

Unknown date

April

3 April

 The Federal Court of Australia is seeking damages of $120 million from Shenzhen Energy Transport for damage to the reef.

20 April

22 April

May

2 May

6 May

7 May

8 May

20 May

June

9 June

12 June

23 June

July

2 July

6 July

7 July

10 July

14 July

15 July

29 July

31 July

August

7 August

9 August

September

3 September

5 September

20 September

23 September

29 September

October

5 October

7 October

8 October

9 October

12 October

16 October

19 October

20 October

22 October

24 October

27 October

28 October

November

8 November

9 November

11 November

30 November

December

4 December

5 December

8 December

10 December

11 December

12 December

13 December

14 December

15 December

16 December

17 December

18 December

24 December

27 December

28 December

31 December

References

2010
 
Ship